Haute Aboujagane is a small Canadian community in Westmorland County, New Brunswick.  It is part of the rural community of Beaubasin East.

Situated inland from the Northumberland Strait near Shediac, the community is also called La Ha by locals. It is connected to the village of Memramcook via Route 933, a dirt road.

History

Notable people

See also
List of communities in New Brunswick

References

https://web.archive.org/web/20070930050306/http://www.bassincappele.com/ENG/description.cfm

 Greater Shediac
 list of communities in New Brunswick

Communities in Greater Shediac
Communities in Westmorland County, New Brunswick
Designated places in New Brunswick